Maria Antonietta Perino is an Italian engineer who is Director International Network Opportunities Development at the Thales Alenia Space. She has previously served as Director for Advanced Exploration Programs, in which capacity she oversaw the ExoMars research programme. In 2019, she was awarded the Stella al Merito del Lavoro by the President of Italy.

Early life and education 
Perino is from Italy. She attended the Polytechnic University of Turin, where she majored in nuclear engineering. Perino took part in the first International Space University summer school, and was appointed to the faculty soon after.

Career 
In 1986, Perino joined the Thales Alenia Space, where she was responsible for Italian Space Agency and European Space Agency research missions including ExoMars and the Mars sample-return. She investigated the feasibility of fabricating solar cells on the moon to facilitate space exploration. Silicon, which is used in the manufacture of solar panels, is abundant on the moon, and Perino argued that these solar panels would significantly reduce the cost of transporting power to space destinations. Thales Alenia Space was responsible for building over 50% of the pressurised volume of the International Space Station.

Perino was named Director of Advanced Exploration in 2010.  She focusses on supporting early career scientists in the space industry.

Awards and honours 
 2010 Association Imprenditrici E Donne Dirigenti D'Azienda (AIDDA) Woman of Excellence
 2019 President of Italy Stella al Merito del Lavoro

Selected publications

References 

Living people
Year of birth missing (living people)
Italian aerospace engineers
Italian women engineers
Polytechnic University of Turin alumni